John William Kentish (21 January 1910 – 26 October 2006) was an English operatic tenor.

Kentish was born in Blackheath, Kent, and was the elder brother of the painter David Kentish.
He died in Chipping Norton, Oxfordshire, aged 96.

External links
 Obituary

1910 births
2006 deaths
People educated at Rugby School
English tenors
20th-century British male opera singers